Jim Dziura is an American film director, cinematographer, and editor. His work often involves heavily music-related themes and his subjects are often marginalized members of society. His work includes the feature-documentary Whiskey on a Sunday (2006) about the rock band Flogging Molly for which Jim was awarded a Platinum disc from the RIAA, the short documentary film Steel Don't Bend (2007) about modern-day hobos, the short documentary film That's Life (2007) about punk rock icon Duane Peters, the 10-episode Road to the Throwdown series (2008) about the rock band The Mighty Mighty Bosstones, and the feature-length documentary Number One with a Bullet (2008) produced by QD3 and starring Ice Cube, KRS-One, Young Buck, B-Real, Obie Trice, Jerry Heller, and Damon Dash. The film was the opening night film at the 2008 Hollywood Film Festival and additionally screened at 2009 South by Southwest Film Festival. In 2001, Jim directed a feature-length documentary about Swedish musician Moneybrother for Red Bull .

Jim has directed and/or edited commercials for Sprite, Boost Mobile, Nike, Inc., the Virginia Tobacco Settlement Fund, Ford Motor Company and Interscope Records.

Jim often works closely with director Doug Pray.

Jim has a BA from Colorado College and currently lives in Los Angeles.

Filmography
Scratch: All the Way Live (2004)- cinematographer, editor
Whiskey on a Sunday (2005)- director, cinematographer, editor
Infamy (2005)- second unit director
Steel Don't Bend (2006)- co-director
That's Life (2007)- director, cinematographer, editor
Big Rig (2008)- gaffer
Number One with a Bullet (2008)- director, cinematographer, editor
Start a Fire (2011)- director, editor

External links
Homepage

Whiskey on a Sunday
Big Rig
Infamy
SWINDLE Magazine article on the making of "Big Rig"
GIANT Magazine profile on Jim Dziura

American documentary filmmakers
Year of birth missing (living people)
Living people
Colorado College alumni
Film directors from Los Angeles